Vitta may refer to:

Estádio Décio Vitta, a multi-use stadium
Mandello Vitta, a comune (municipality) in the Province of Novara in the Italian region Piedmont
Vitta Foods
Vitta (botany), an oil tube found in the fruits of some plants
Vitta (gastropod) Mörch, 1852, a genus of molluscs of the family Neritidae
Vitta (cestode) Burt, 1938, a genus of cestodes of the family Dilepididae
Hasora vitta, a butterfly